Nicole Avery Cox (born June 2, 1978) is an American actress known mostly for her roles on the television series Unhappily Ever After, Las Vegas, The Norm Show, and Nikki.

Career 
Cox began her career at the age of four, when she appeared as a dancer in several ballet productions and TV specials. She began acting at the age of ten, making appearances in several movies and guest-starring on shows such as Baywatch, Star Trek: The Next Generation, Mama's Family, Eerie, Indiana, and Blossom. She also appeared in General Hospital from 1993 to 1995, and had a recurring role on the Saturday morning program  California Dreams.

Her appearances on various TV shows led to her first prime-time role as Tiffany Malloy on the sitcom Unhappily Ever After, which ran on The WB from 1995–1999 for a total of five seasons. Her brother Matthew guest-starred on a handful of episodes, including one where he wore a "Ghostface" mask (the type of mask featured in Scream).

After Unhappily Ever After was cancelled (she appeared in all 100 episodes), Cox went on to portray Taylor Clayton, a former call-girl turned social worker on the ABC television sitcom The Norm Show which lasted for three seasons (she appeared in 27 of its 54 episodes). Next she starred as Nikki White in Nikki, another sitcom vehicle that lasted for two seasons on The WB (2000–2002).

The most successful show Cox co-starred in following her time on Unhappily Ever After was on the NBC TV drama Las Vegas from 2003–2007 for a total of four seasons. She played Mary Connell for 88 episodes. However, Cox would not appear on the fifth and final season of the show. On May 20 and 23, 2005, her Las Vegas character crossed over to NBC's soap opera Passions to coincide with the arrival of two new characters introduced on Las Vegas.

In 2006, she became the spokesmodel for the online gaming website Sportsbook.com. In 2009, she provided the voice of Jenna in Leisure Suit Larry: Box Office Bust. That same year, she also appeared in Lonely Street, a comedy,  starring Robert Patrick, Jay Mohr, Ernie Hudson, and Lindsay Price. In 2016, Cox was nominated as the sole writer for Mohr's album Happy. And A Lot for the Grammy Award for Best Comedy Album at the 58th Annual Grammy Awards.

Personal life 
Cox dated co-star Kevin Connolly from Unhappily Ever After while the two were on the show. In 1997, she was engaged to Bobcat Goldthwait, 16 years her senior, who voiced the character of Mr. Floppy on that same show.

On December 29, 2006, she married comedian/actor Jay Mohr in Los Angeles. The two met on the set of Las Vegas.  In December 2008, Mohr petitioned a Los Angeles court to allow him to legally add her last name to his, changing his name to Jon Ferguson Cox Mohr. Cox and Mohr have a son. On the May 16, 2017, episode of The Adam Carolla Show, Mohr confirmed that he and Cox were "in the middle" of a divorce. Their divorce was finalized in August 2018.

Filmography

References

External links 

Living people
20th-century American actresses
21st-century American actresses
Actresses from Los Angeles
American child actresses
American female dancers
American dancers
American film actresses
American soap opera actresses
American television actresses
1978 births